Judith Sarmiento Granada (born 20 January 1954) is a Colombian lawyer and journalist known nationally for her work in various radio and television media since the 1970s.

Biography
Judith Sarmiento was born in Armenia, Colombia, on 20 January 1954, the daughter of Gilberto Sarmiento and Ofelia Granada.

Her education took place in Bogotá, at the La Merced school, at the Universidad Externado de Colombia – where she majored in law and political science – and at the University of La Sabana, where she specialized in organizational communication.

She has one daughter and a grandson. Her favorite author is José María Vargas Vila.

Professional career

Radio
Sarmiento began her career in radio on the Todelar network in 1975. She later worked at Caracol, RCN, and Radio Nacional de Colombia, among others.

Television
In 1980, Sarmiento began working in television on 's Telediario.

Teaching
Sarmiento has been a teacher of journalism, organizational communication, and radio planning at the Externado, Military, and Politécnico Grancolombiano universities. She also authored the United Nations Development Programme's course "Democracy and Media in the Virtual Course".

Awards and recognitions
  for best TV news anchor (1990)
  (2001)
 Gloria Valencia de Castaño Award for Best News Announcer from the Colombian Association of Broadcasters (2016)
 Golden Walnut Award from Corporación Universitaria Unitec (2011)

References

External links
 

1954 births
20th-century Colombian lawyers
Colombian radio journalists
Colombian television journalists
Colombian women journalists
Colombian women lawyers
Living people
People from Armenia, Colombia
Universidad Externado de Colombia alumni
Academic staff of Universidad Externado de Colombia
20th-century journalists
21st-century journalists
Colombian women radio journalists
Colombian women television journalists
Colombian women radio presenters
Colombian women television presenters
Colombian television presenters
University of La Sabana alumni
20th-century women lawyers